Louis Meyer (July 21, 1904 – October 7, 1995) was an American Hall of Fame race car driver who was the first three-time winner of the Indianapolis 500.

Biography
Born in lower Manhattan, New York on July 21, 1904, he was the son of French immigrants, Meyer was raised in Los Angeles, where he began automobile racing at various California tracks.

Early in his career, he helped prepare the Miller driven by Frank Elliott in 1926, destroking the engine to bring it within the  displacement limit permitted by the rules. Meyer went with the car when it was sold in 1927 to Fred Holliday (of Holliday Steel Company) as the Jynx Special (a morbidly ironic name, since Jimmy Murphy had been killed in it in 1924). He would be mechanic for Wilbur Shaw in the Indianapolis 500 that year. Meyer also served as co-driver, taking the car from seventh place up to sixth.

In 1928, Phil Shafer's intended Miller entry went up for sale, and Alden Sampson bought the car for Meyer. He earned consistent points finishes to make him AAA's National Champion. He would claim the title again in 1929 and 1933.

At the 1929 Indianapolis 500, Ray Keech beat Meyer, only to be killed at Altoona two weeks later, the season's second   event there, which Meyer won, averaging .

Meyer managed only fourth place at the 1930 Indianapolis 500, and the Great Depression curtailed racing.  That, plus the closure of many board tracks as unsafe, led Meyer to concentrate more on dirt track racing.

In 1933's 500, at the wheel of the Tydol Special Miller, Meyer took the lead on Lap 129. Meyer steadily increased his lead from there, until he was fully four laps up on the field by the checkered flag. Despite lifting later in the race, Meyer's race average, was still a record. By winning his second 500, he joined a fairly exclusive club.  Meyer started the tradition of drinking milk (buttermilk at the time) in victory lane that year, when he drank a glass. Following his 1936 victory, he drank from a glass milk bottle instead, as most race winners have done since.

Meyer followed his success in 1935, forming Champion Drivers, Inc., to promote racing, along with nine other top racers.

Following the suggestion of former race winner, Tommy Milton, that year he became the first driver to receive the Pace Car as part of the race winnings.

Meyer came close to winning a (then-record) fourth 500 in 1939, in the Bowes Seal Fast Special Miller. Battling Shaw with just four laps to go, Meyer lost control and spun; while unhurt, Meyer's race was lost. He sold the Miller to Rex Mays the next year, going back to becoming a mechanic—or, rather an engine builder: he went into partnership with Dale Drake, taking over Offenhauser's engine plant. Meyer-Drake Offys would dominate Indy for most of the next two decades, powering every winner until 1968.

Meyer joined Ford in 1964, and through worked on development of the Ford V8, which powered four 500 winners in that time.

Meyer's wife June did not even know he was racing in the 1928 Indianapolis 500. Earlier in the day she was in Pennsylvania picking up a wrecked car and after that went to see her brother-in-law Eddie Meyer race in Reading. She found out about her husband's victory after the track announcer in Reading asked the crowd to give a big hand to Eddie Meyer, the brother of the Indianapolis 500 winner.

Meyer died on November 7, 1995 in Searchlight, Nevada, aged 91, where he had been living in retirement since 1972. He was interred at Inglewood Park Cemetery in Inglewood, California.

Legacy
Meyer's son Louis (Sonny) Meyer, Jr. assisted him in engine work at his race shops, and worked on the various DOHC Ford engines in USAC racing, including building 15 Indianapolis 500-winning engines. Grandson Louis III (Butch) built Oldsmobile Aurora engines for Team Menard in Indy Racing League IndyCar Series competition, winning the 1996-97 (18-month season) and 1999 championships before becoming the Indy Pro Series (now Indy Lights) director.

Meyer's offspring continue to work in Indy racing.  Louis Meyer III and his sons Louis (Michael) Meyer IV, and Matt Meyer are joint owners of Legacy Autosport with investors of the Metalloid Corporation, a team part of the Road to Indy.  .

Meyer was inducted in the Indianapolis Motor Speedway Hall of Fame in 1963.  Meyer, Jr. was inducted in 2013.

He was inducted into the Motorsports Hall of Fame of America in 1993.

He was not related to fellow driver Zeke Meyer.

Indianapolis 500 Results

References

Sources 
Wise, David Burgess.   "Meyer:  The first triple Indy winner", in Ward, Ian, executive editor. World of Automobiles Volume 12, p. 1330.  London: Orbis, 1974.

External links

 Don Garrison Collection, oral history interview with Louis Meyer - Ball State University Archives and Special Collections Research Center - External link
The Greatest 33

1904 births
1995 deaths
Racing drivers from Los Angeles
American people of French descent
Champ Car champions
Indianapolis 500 drivers
Indianapolis 500 winners
International Motorsports Hall of Fame inductees
National Sprint Car Hall of Fame inductees
Racing drivers from New York City
People from Searchlight, Nevada
Burials at Inglewood Park Cemetery
AAA Championship Car drivers